Ruth England (born 29 March 1970) is a British television presenter and actress. From 2010 to 2012, she starred in the Discovery Channel show Man, Woman, Wild with her husband Mykel Hawke, a former US Army Special Forces officer.

A graduate from the University of Westminster, Ruth has worked for the BBC, CNBC, ITV and Fox TV.

Credits
Jailbreak, Channel 5 (2000) – co-presenter
Under Pressure, Channel 5 (2001) – co-presenter
Wish You Were Here...?, ITV (2001–2003) – presenter
Forever Eden, (2004) – presenter
Walk This Way, ITV (2004) – presenter
ChuckleVision, No Getting Away, BBC (2004) – Herself
ChuckleVision, A Job Well Done, BBC (2005) – Reporter
Wish You Were Here Today, ITV (2005) – presenter
Bootsale Treasure Hunt, ITV – presenter
Five News, Channel 5 – presenter
The Big Breakfast, Channel 4 – newsreader
World's Most Extreme Homes (2006) – host
Sky High, ITV Central (2007)
Angel (2007) – cast, as neighbour
Squawk Box, CNBC (2008) – host
BBC1 Primetime Inside Out (2009) – presenter on current affairs
Man, Woman, Wild (2010–2012) – main cast
Lost Survivors (2013) – main cast

References

External links

 Official Website
 Sara Cameron Talent

1970 births
Living people
People from Wychavon (district)
British actresses
British television personalities
Alumni of the University of Westminster
Alumni of Middlesex University